The discography of Australian hard rock band Rose Tattoo includes seven studio albums, two live albums, seven compilation albums and nineteen singles.

Albums

Studio albums

Live albums

Compilation albums

Singles

References

General
 Note: Archived [on-line] copy has limited functionality.

Specific

External Links
 

Discographies of Australian artists
Rock music group discographies
Pop music group discographies